Live at the Apollo (formerly titled Jack Dee Live at the Apollo) is a British stand-up comedy programme performed from the Hammersmith Apollo. Despite the title, the programmes are recorded, not live.

Jack Dee hosted the first two series and the opening show of the third series, performing a short segment before introducing a guest comedian. Until 2015, all episodes were broadcast on BBC One. The show moved to BBC Two in November 2015. The programme was renamed for its third series which was filmed over three evenings in October 2007. The format was changed to suit with one of the night's performers assuming hosting duties.

A fourth series began transmission on 28 November 2008. It showcased a variety of the newer stand-up comedians and was rescheduled from Monday nights to Friday nights to replace Friday Night with Jonathan Ross after Ross's suspension in the wake of the Sachsgate row. After hosting the first episode, Michael McIntyre got his own show of a similar format; Michael McIntyre's Comedy Roadshow was broadcast for a series of six episodes in 2009.

A fifth series aired in late 2009 and early 2010, the recordings of which took place in October 2009. This series was initially broadcast as edited 30-minute episodes, but the full length (45-minute) versions were then shown in May, June and July 2010.

Episode list
Viewing figures from BARB and British Comedy Guide.

Series 1 (2004)

Series 2 (2005)

Series 3 (2007)

Series 4 (2008–2009)

Series 5 (2009–2010)

Series 6 (2010–2011)

Series 7 (2011–2012)

Series 8 (2012–2013)

Series 9 (2013–2014)

Series 10 (2014–2015)

Series 11 (2015)
The eleventh series of Live at the Apollo was broadcast on BBC Two for the first time, beginning on 9 November 2015.

Series 12 (2016)
The twelfth series of Live at the Apollo was broadcast on BBC Two from 8 November 2016.

Series 13 (2017–2018)
The thirteenth series of Live at the Apollo was broadcast on BBC Two from 30 November 2017.

Series 14 (2018)
The fourteenth series of Live at the Apollo was broadcast on BBC Two from 15 November 2018.

Series 15 (2019)
The fifteenth series of Live at the Apollo was broadcast on BBC Two from 5 November 2019.

Series 16 (2021)
The sixteenth series of Live at the Apollo was broadcast on BBC Two from 10 November 2021. This show wasn't filmed the previous year (2020) due to the ongoing COVID-19 pandemic.

Series 17 (2022–23)
The seventeenth series of Live at the Apollo will be broadcast on BBC Two from 19 December 2022.

Specials
Assorted special episodes have been broadcast by the BBC.

Guest appearances
The following have appeared as a guest on the show multiple times up to and including the broadcast episodes of series 15:

References

External links 

2004 British television series debuts
2000s British comedy television series
2010s British comedy television series
2020s British comedy television series
BBC television comedy
British stand-up comedy television series
English-language television shows